Engine Company No. 11 was a fire-engine company in Philadelphia.  Established in 1871, it was a segregated African-American company from 1919, and was desegregated in 1952.

References

Fire stations in Pennsylvania
Fire stations completed in 1871
1871 establishments in Pennsylvania
African-American history of Pennsylvania